Revival is the second album by Canadian R&B artist Jully Black. The album was released on October 16, 2007. The album has been proven to be her most successful record as it was certified gold by the Canadian Recording Industry Association with sales of over 50,000 copies.

Critical reception

Matthew Chisling of AllMusic found the album an improvement over This Is Me, praising the production for containing both retro and modern beats, and Black as a performer and songwriter, concluding that "On Revival, we see so many sides of a truly multi-dimensional Black who, thanks to more than a decade of struggle and failure, releases a powerful showing of delicious Rhythm & Blues to her fans and leaves them coming back for more. Black has improved in every aspect, and establishes herself as a truly credible R&B Canadian diva who deserves heaps of praise and success; Canada, you've found your Mary J." Ryan B. Patrick of Exclaim! also gave praise to the production but said that listeners might be put off by it playing safe and yearn for Black's trademark genre-mixing sound, concluding that, "In the grand scheme of things however, its remarkable that a Canadian R&B artist even gets to record a sophomore disc, much less one as ambitious as this. Revival rocks rightly, plays it safe and essentially ensures Black a lengthy and award-winning Canadian career." Jason Richards, writing for NOW, was critical of the album's single "Seven Day Fool" and felt that it carried over on the production sounding mainstream and radio-friendly, concluding that "[T]he canned production is undeservedly insipid and needlessly limits Black's potent and versatile energy. The only highlight is "Wishing", which makes brilliant use of a whistling sample heard in Kill Bill."

Track listing

Samples
"My Baby" contains an interpolation and sample of "Love Jones" by Clarence Johnson, Ralph Larry Eskridge and Randolph Murph performed by Brighter Side of Darkness.
"Wishing" contains elements from "Twisted Nerve" written and composed by Herrmann.

Personnel
Credits adapted from the liner notes of Revival.
Dylan "3D" Dresdow: mixing (Paper VU Studios, Los Angeles, CA)
Brad Blackwood: mastering (Euphonic Masters)
David "Click" Cox: A&R
Garnet Armstrong: art direction
Susan Michalek: design
Ivan Otis: photography
Peter Papapetrou: stylist
Ryan Reed: hair
Shauna Llewellyn: make-up
Colin Lewis: booking agent (The Agency Group)
Sandy Pandya: management (Pandyamonium Artist Management)

References

2007 albums
Jully Black albums
Universal Music Canada albums
Juno Award for R&B/Soul Recording of the Year recordings